The Pink Star, formerly known as the Steinmetz Pink, is a diamond weighing 59.60 carat (11.92 g), rated in color as Fancy Vivid Pink by the Gemological Institute of America. The Pink Star was mined by De Beers in 1999 in South Africa, and weighed 132.5 carat in the rough. The Pink Star is the largest known diamond having been rated Vivid Pink. As a result of this exceptional rarity, the Beny Steinmetz Group called Steinmetz Diamonds took a cautious 20 months to cut the Pink. It was unveiled in Monaco on 29 May 2003 in a public ceremony.

The Pink Star was displayed (as the Steinmetz Pink) as part of the Smithsonian's "The Splendor of Diamonds" exhibit, alongside the De Beers Millennium Star, the world’s second largest (the Cullinan I is the largest) top colour (D) internally and externally flawless pear-shaped diamond at 203.04 carat (40.608 g), the Heart of Eternity Diamond, a 27.64 carat (5.582 g) heart-cut blue diamond and the Moussaieff Red Diamond, the world's largest known Fancy Red diamond at 5.11 carat (1.022 ml)

2013 and 2017 auctions
The Pink Star was auctioned by Sotheby's Geneva on 13 November 2013. The sale price was CHF 68,000,000 (CHF 76,325,000, USD 83,187,381 including commission fees), a world record for any gemstone. The record had been held by the Graff Pink. The Pink Star was bought by New York diamond cutter Isaac Wolf who renamed it The Pink Dream although, according to Forbes magazine, the auction price was not settled by the buyer and the stone was again added to the Sotheby's inventory.

On 3 April 2017, the Pink Star was sold at an auction in Hong Kong for US$71.2 million to Chow Tai Fook Enterprises.

Names
 1999–2007: The Steinmetz Pink
 2007–2017: The Pink Star
 2017–present: CTF Pink Star

See also
 List of diamonds
 Graff Pink (diamond); prior to the November 2013 auction the most expensive diamond of any color to be sold at auction.

References

 Natural resources of Africa. "The Steinmetz Pink". Retrieved 26 April 2017.
 Smithsonian Museum of Natural History. "The Splendor of Diamonds". Retrieved 13 April 2005.
 The World of Famous Diamonds. "The Steinmetz Pink".

External links
 Value of Steinmetz Pink Diamond 100 Million

Pink diamonds
Diamonds originating in South Africa
Individual diamonds